René Donoyan (8 April 1940 – 30 October 2021) was a French football player and manager. He played as a goalkeeper, notably for AS Saint-Étienne, FC Sochaux-Montbéliard, and FC Nantes. Throughout his career, he played 61 matches in Division 1, 222 matches in Division 2, and one match in the UEFA Cup.

Honours
Saint-Étienne
 Division 1: 1963–64
 Division 2: 1962–63

Nantes
 Division 1: 1972–73

References

External links
 

1940 births
2021 deaths
French footballers
Association football goalkeepers
Ligue 1 players
Ligue 2 players
ES La Ciotat players
AS Saint-Étienne players
AS Cherbourg Football players
FC Sochaux-Montbéliard players
AS Béziers Hérault (football) players
FC Lorient players
Pays d'Aix FC players
FC Nantes players
Sportspeople from Bouches-du-Rhône
People from La Ciotat
Footballers from Provence-Alpes-Côte d'Azur